Charaxes hadrianus, the Hadrian's white charaxes, is a butterfly in the family Nymphalidae.This is a very rare charaxes, especially in West Africa. Individuals come to fruit-baited traps.  Schultze states that freshly
captured males emit a smell of violets.

Taxonomy
Charaxes hadrianus is the sole member of the Charaxes hadrianus group. The type locality is Cameroun.

Distribution and habitat
This species can be found in Guinea, Sierra Leone, Liberia, Ivory Coast, south-western Ghana, Nigeria, Cameroon, Gabon, the Republic of the Congo, the Central African Republic, the Democratic Republic of the Congo and western Uganda. The habitat consists of wet primary forests.

Description

The upperside of the forewings is white, with a brown basal area and a black apical part showing several white spots. The underside of the forewings is grey, with a large black eyespot. The upperside of the hindwings is white, with black outer margins. The underside of the hindwings is crossed vertically midway  by a red band, with a row of small black spot on the outer margin.

Description in Seitz
Hadrianus Group. 
This group is only represented by a single species of characteristic appearance. Hindwing above and both wings beneath with white ground-colour. The black transverse streaks in the basal part of the under surface are very fine and in part indistinct or entirely suppressed; in cellule lb of the forewing near the hinder angle a large, deep black spot. The tails of the hindwing are obtuse, the one at vein 2 about 2 mm., that at vein 4 nearly 5 mm. in length. Sexes alike in colour and markings. Ch. hadrianus Ward Forewing at the base red-brown nearly to vein 3, then black with a white median band, at the hindmargin about 15 mm. in breadth, but rapidly narrowing anteriorly and terminating at vein 5, with two small white discal spots in cellules 5 and 6, white submarginal spots in 2-6 and a white marginal spot in lb. Hindwing above narrowly red-brown at the base, with black submarginal and marginal streaks at the distal margin. Beneath the hindwing has in the middle a thick black transverse line, distally accompanied by a deeply dentate red-brown transverse band; this transverse band shows through above. A beautiful but rare species, occurring from the Niger to the Congo.

Biology
The larvae feed on Ourateaspecies (Ouratea reticulata) and Ochna species.

References

Seitz, A. Die Gross-Schmetterlinge der Erde 13: Die Afrikanischen Tagfalter. Plate XIII 31
Victor Gurney Logan Van Someren, 1972 Revisional notes on African Charaxes (Lepidoptera: Nymphalidae). Part VIII. Bulletin of the British Museum'' (Natural History) (Entomology)215-264.

External links
Charaxes hadrianus images at Consortium for the Barcode of Life
Charaxes hadrianus lecerfi images at BOLD
Images of C. hadrianus hadrianus Royal Museum for Central Africa (Albertine Rift Project)
 Butterflies of Ghana

Butterflies described in 1871
hadrianus
Butterflies of Africa
Taxa named by Christopher Ward (entomologist)